Pam Johnson (November 14, 1946 — January 20, 2021) was the first woman to serve as managing editor of The Arizona Republic, the 15th largest newspaper in the U.S. and the largest newspaper in Arizona.  She was also the first female managing editor of The Republic's sister newspaper, The Phoenix Gazette. In addition to her newspaper management career, Johnson worked at the Poynter Institute for Media Studies in Florida and then as executive director of the Donald W. Reynolds Journalism Institute at the University of Missouri's School of Journalism, starting in 2004. Johnson, who died in Jan 2021, graduated from Missouri School of Journalism in 1969 with a bachelor's degree.

Johnson and reporters from the Kansas City Star and the Kansas City Times were awarded a Pulitzer Prize for team coverage of the Hyatt Regency walkway collapse in 1982.

References

1946 births
2021 deaths
American women journalists
Missouri Southern State University alumni
University of Missouri alumni
University of Missouri faculty
People from Carthage, Missouri
21st-century American journalists
Editors of Arizona newspapers
20th-century American newspaper editors
Pulitzer Prize winners for journalism
20th-century American women
21st-century American women